Springburn/Robroyston (Ward 17) is one of the 23 wards of Glasgow City Council. Created as Springburn, in 2007 and in 2012 it returned three council members, using the single transferable vote system. For the 2017 Glasgow City Council election, the boundaries were changed, the ward increased in size and population (the latter by 20%), was renamed Springburn/Robroyston and returned four members.

Boundaries
Located in the north of Glasgow, the original core of the ward centred around the district of Springburn (including the neighbourhoods of Stobhill, Old Balornock, Petershill and Balgrayhill), as well as part of Cowlairs (streets to the east of the Glasgow to Edinburgh via Falkirk Line railway tracks which form the ward's western boundary), and part of Colston (streets to the east of Springburn Road and south of Colston Road - north of this belongs to the adjoining town of Bishopbriggs in East Dunbartonshire which forms the northern boundary).

The 2017 changes were substantial: the southern boundary was moved north from the M8 motorway to the Cumbernauld Line railway, with the Royston, Germiston and Sighthill neighbourhoods assigned to a new Dennistoun ward along with commercial/industrial land at Blochairn and St Rollox. However, territory further east was reassigned from the North East ward into the Springburn ward, which was renamed as a result: Robroyston, Barmulloch, Wallacewell, Balornock and the streets in Millerston within Glasgow were all added; the eastern boundary is now with North Lanarkshire.

Councillors

Election results

2022 election
2022 Glasgow City Council election

2017 election
2017 Glasgow City Council election

2012 election
2012 Glasgow City Council election

2007 election
2007 Glasgow City Council election

See also
Wards of Glasgow

References

External links
Listed Buildings in Springburn/Robroyston Ward, Glasgow City at British Listed Buildings

Wards of Glasgow
Springburn